Samir Seliminski (born 9 May 1969, in Isperih) is a Bulgarian former football player and was the football manager of Akademik Sofia.

Career

As player
Born in Isperih, Seliminski played in his career for small amateur sides F.C. Han Asparuh and Levski Glavinitsa.

As coach
On 9 September 2009, Seliminski was presented as a new head coach of Akademik Sofia. By the end of the season, Seliminski had guided Akademik to promotion to the A PFG, for the first time in 28 years.

He was also a coach for Shreveport United Soccer Club, in Shreveport, Louisiana.

References

Living people
1969 births
Bulgarian footballers
Bulgarian football managers
Association footballers not categorized by position